Alvin Carl Weingand (June 11, 1904 - January 11, 1995) (North Platte, Nebraska), moved to California in 1920.   He attended Los Angeles Polytechnic High School and in 1927 he earned his B.A. in economics at the University of California, Berkeley.

He served in the California legislature from the 31st District and during World War II he served in the United States Navy.

Weingand is mentioned in the memoir The Moon's a Balloon by film star David Niven. According to Niven, Weingand was a desk clerk at a Los Angeles hotel around 1934 and generously allowed the struggling actor to stay in a small room at a greatly reduced rent.

References
The San Ysidor Ranch by Michael Redmon : bought by actor Ronald Colman and Alvin Weingand in 1935.

External links
Join California Alvin C. Weingand

United States Navy personnel of World War II
1904 births
People from North Platte, Nebraska
UC Berkeley College of Letters and Science alumni
1995 deaths
20th-century American politicians
Democratic Party California state senators